Fernando Sergio Marcelo Marcos Belaúnde Terry (October 7, 1912 – June 4, 2002) was a Peruvian politician who twice served as President of Peru (1963–1968 and 1980–1985). Deposed by a military coup in 1968, he was re-elected in 1980 after twelve years of military rule.

Early life and education 
The second of four children, Belaúnde was born in Lima into an aristocratic family of Spanish forebears: his father, Rafael Belaúnde Diez Canseco (1886–1972), a professor, served as Prime Minister under José Bustamante y Rivero; his paternal grandfather, Mariano Andrés Belaunde, was a Finance Minister; and one of his great-grandfathers, Pedro Diez Canseco, was also President of the Republic.

He attended the Sagrados Corazones Recoleta in Lima.

During the dictatorship of Augusto B. Leguía, the persecution for the political activities of his father Rafael and his uncle Víctor Andrés Belaúnde prompted the family to move to France in 1924, where Fernando attended high school and received his initial University education in engineering.

From 1930 to 1935, Belaúnde studied architecture in the United States, where he first attended the University of Miami (where his father was also teaching), and in 1935 transferred to the University of Texas at Austin, where he obtained his degree as an architect. He later moved to Mexico and worked as an architect for a brief time, but returned to Peru in 1936 and started his professional career as an architect designing private homes. In 1937, he started a magazine called El Arquitecto Peruano ("Peruvian Architect"), which dealt with interior design, general urbanism and housing problems the country was facing. This also gave way to the Architects Association of Peru and the Urbanism Institute of Peru.

As a result, Belaúnde also became a government public-housing consultant throughout the country and abroad. In 1943, Belaúnde began teaching architecture and urban planning at Escuela Nacional de Ingenieros of Lima and later became the dean of the Civil Engineering and Architecture department. Belaúnde also directed the construction, along with other professors and students, of the faculty of architecture of the National University of Engineering in 1955.

Political career 

Belaúnde's political career began in 1944 as cofounder of the National Democratic Front party which elected José Bustamante as president in 1945; he served in the Peruvian Congress until a coup by General Manuel Odría in 1948 interrupted democratic elections.

Belaúnde would return to the political arena in 1956, when the outgoing Odría dictatorship called for elections and he led the slate submitted by the "National Front of Democratic Youth", an organization formed by reform-minded university students, some of which had studied under him; his principled support for the "La Prensa" newspaper, which had been closed down by the dictatorship in early 1956, had prompted the leadership of the National Front to approach him as to lead its slate.

"El Manguerazo" 

He gained notoriety on June 1 of the same year when, after the national election board refused to accept his candidacy filing, he led a massive protest that became known as the "manguerazo" or "hosedown" from the powerful water cannons used by the police to repress the demonstrators. When it seemed that the confrontation was going to turn violent, Belaúnde showed the gift for symbolism that would serve him well throughout his political life; calming down the demonstrators and armed solely with a Peruvian flag, he crossed alone the gap separating the demonstrators from the police to deliver an ultimatum to the police chief that his candidacy be accepted.

The government capitulated, and the striking image of Belaúnde walking by himself with the flag was featured by the news magazine Caretas the following day, in an article entitled "Así Nacen Los Lideres" ("This is how Leaders are Born").

Belaúnde and "Acción Popular"

Opposition to Manuel Prado
Belaúnde's 1956 candidacy was ultimately unsuccessful, as the dictatorship-favored right-wing candidacy of Manuel Prado took first place. Claiming irregularities, he prepared to lead the opposition, and in July 1956 in Chincheros, Cuzco, founded the Acción Popular party, claiming the mantle of recapturing indigenous Inca traditions of community and cooperation in a modern social democratic context, placing itself squarely between the pro-oligarchy right-wing and the radicalism of the left-wing APRA and communist parties.

He would go on to travel extensively throughout the country, fleshing out the ideological principles of Acción Popular, while leading the opposition. During this period Belaúnde's traditionalism would manifest itself in dramatic flourishes, most notoriously when he challenged to a duel a Pradista congressman who refused to retract insulting statements in an open letter; the duel took place, with minor scratches on both sides.

In 1959, the Prado government's refusal to authorize the permits for Accion Popular annual convention led to another confrontation: Belaúnde led the opening of the convention in defiance of the prohibition, and the Prado government arrested and jailed him in the Alcatraz-like island prison of El Frontón off the Lima coast. The imprisonment lasted 12 days, during which Belaúnde engaged in a failed attempt to escape by swimming to freedom; the Prado government, facing unrelenting public pressure, was forced to release him and drop all charges.

1962 and 1963
Belaúnde ran for president once again in the general elections of 1962, this time with his own party, Acción Popular. The results were very tight; he ended in second place, following Víctor Raúl Haya de la Torre (APRA), by less than 14,000 votes. Since none of the candidates managed to get the constitutionally-established minimum of one third of the vote required to win outright, selection of the President would fall to Congress; the long-held antagonistic relationship between the military and APRA prompted Haya de la Torre to make a deal with former dictator Odría, who had come in third, which would result in Odría taking the Presidency in a coalition government.

However, widespread allegations of fraud prompted the Peruvian military to depose Prado and install a military junta, led by Ricardo Pérez Godoy. Pérez Godoy ran a short transitional government and held new elections in 1963, which were won by Belaúnde by a more comfortable but still narrow five percent margin.

First presidency (1963–1968)
During Belaúnde's first term in office, he spurred numerous developmental projects. These included the Carretera Marginal de la Selva, a much-needed highway linking Chiclayo on the Pacific coast with then isolated northern regions of Amazonas and San Martín.

He also advanced the ambitious Santiago Antunez de Mayolo and Chira Piura irrigation projects, and the Tinajones, Jequetepeque, Majes, Chavimochic, Olmos, Chinecas hydroelectric projects. Belaúnde also oversaw the establishment of the Peruvian National Bank (Banco de la Nación). To alleviate poverty, Belaúnde also promoted a program of "social interest" homes in Lima and other cities, which benefited dozen thousands of families. Legal recognition was also given to hundreds of indigenous Indian communities, the hospital network was expanded into uncovered areas, and improvements were made in social security coverage. However, his administration was also blamed for making bad economic decisions, and by 1967 the sol was seriously devaluated.

In August 1968, the Belaúnde Administration announced the settlement of a long-standing dispute with a subsidiary of Standard Oil of New Jersey over claims to the rich La Brea and Pariñas oil fields. However, widespread anger about Belaúnde's decision to pay the Standard Oil compensation for handing over the installation to Peru forced his cabinet to resign on October 1.

A further cause of anger was the fact that the document of agreement was given by Belaúnde to the press with the final page eleven missing and signatures were squeezed at the bottom of page ten.  The missing page eleven became a cause célèbre and was later shown on television containing the contribution that Belaúnde had promised to pay. Several days later, Belaúnde himself was removed from office by a military coup led by general Juan Velasco Alvarado, who would go on to become dictator of Peru for 7 years.

Exile and 1980 election
Belaúnde spent the next decade in the United States, teaching at Harvard, Johns Hopkins and George Washington University. Meanwhile, the military regime established by General Velasco instituted sweeping but ill-fated reforms, primarily nationalizing the oil industry and redistributing land from large ownership to the campesinos of Peru. In April 1980, with Peru's economy in deep depression, the military administration permitted an election for the restoration of constitutional rule. Belaúnde won a five-year term, polling an impressive 45 percent of the vote in a 15-man contest.

Second presidency (1980–1985)
One of his first actions as president was the return of several newspapers to their respective owners. In this way, freedom of speech once again played an important part in Peruvian politics. Gradually, he attempted to undo some of the most radical effects of the Agrarian Reform initiated by Velasco, and reversed the independent stance that the Military Government of Velasco had with the United States.

At the outbreak of the 1982 Falklands War between Argentina and the United Kingdom, Belaúnde declared that "Peru was ready to support Argentina with all the resources it needed." This included a number of fighter planes from the Peruvian Air Force, ships, and medical teams. Belaúnde's government proposed a peace settlement between the two countries, but the Argentine military junta rejected it and the British launched an attack on the Argentinian forces deployed around the islands. In response to Chile's support of Britain, Belaúnde called for Latin American unity.

In domestic policy, he continued with many of the projects that were planned during his first term, including the completion of what is considered his most important legacy, the Carretera Marginal de la Selva, a much-needed roadway linking Chiclayo on the Pacific coast with then isolated northern regions of Amazonas and San Martín.

After a promising beginning, Belaúnde's popularity eroded under the stress of inflation, the War on Housing's continuation, economic hardship, and terrorism: per capita income declined, Peru's foreign debt burgeoned, and violence by leftist insurgents (notably Shining Path) rose steadily during the internal conflict in Peru, which was launched the day before Belaúnde was elected in 1980. He was president during the peak of the Lost Decade, in which unemployment rose above 50% and homelessness rose above 30%.

Regarding Shining Path, Belaúnde personally did not pay too much attention to this: insurgent movements were already active during his first term, but without much support. In addition, some government officials and insurgents were subsequently accused of human rights violations, and a state of emergency was promulgated in the Ayacucho and Apurímac regions.

During the next years, the economic problems left over from the military government persisted, worsened by an occurrence of the "El Niño" weather phenomenon in 1982–83, which caused widespread flooding in some parts of the country, severe droughts in others, and sharply reduced the schools of ocean fish that are one of the country's major resources.

Post-presidency (1985–2002) 
During the national elections of 1985, Belaúnde's party, Acción Popular, was defeated by APRA candidate Alan García. However, as established in the 1979 Constitution, he would go on to serve in the Peruvian Senate as Senador Vitalicio ("senator for life"), a privilege for former Presidents abolished by the 1993 Constitution.

Notes

Further reading 
Peru's Own Conquest by Fernando Belaúnde Terry (translated by David A. Robinson)
Inside South America by John Gunther
Peru: A Country Study, published by the United States Library of Congress

External links 
[Adelante.doc] Editorial del Diario Expreso
Página oficial de Acción Popular.
Extended biography by CIDOB Foundation (in Spanish)
"Peru mourns death of 'model democrat'" (BBC News)
El Arquitecto Peruano, Belaúnde's magazine (Spanish and English)
Fernando Belaunde Terry  recorded at the Library of Congress for the Hispanic Division’s audio literary archive on  Apr. 22, 1977

1912 births
2002 deaths
Fernando
Peruvian people of Basque descent
Peruvian people of Spanish descent
Leaders ousted by a coup
People from Lima
Peruvian architects
Peruvian democracy activists
Peruvian Roman Catholics
Presidents of Peru
Duellists
University of Miami alumni
University of Texas at Austin School of Architecture alumni
Popular Action (Peru) politicians
Members of the Senate of Peru
Children of national leaders